Nova Canaã Paulista (Portuguese for "New Canaan of São Paulo") is a municipality in the state of São Paulo in Brazil. The population is 1,852 (2020 est.) in an area of 124 km². The elevation is 401 m.

References

Municipalities in São Paulo (state)